São João Baptista (Portuguese meaning Saint John the Baptist) is a freguesia (civil parish) of Cape Verde. It covers the eastern part of the island of Boa Vista. It is named after the church located in Fundo das Figueiras.

Subdivisions
The freguesia consists of the following settlements:
Cabeça dos Tarrafes
Fundo das Figueiras
João Galego

References

Geography of Boa Vista, Cape Verde
Parishes of Cape Verde